Matthias Joseph de Noël (28 December 1782 – 18 November 1849) was a German merchant, painter, art collector and writer.

Life 
Born in Cologne, de Noël learned drawing after a commercial apprenticeship in his home town with Egidius Mengelberg and Caspar Arnold Grein, as well as oil painting with Benedikt Beckenkamp.
After this training, he spent longer periods in Rome and Paris to devote himself entirely to painting.
After his father's death, de Noël returned to Cologne to continue his parents' business.

In 1828, de Noël became curator of Cologne's first municipal museum, the Wallrafianum, later Cologne's Wallraf-Richartz-Museum. There he took over from the curator Johann Jakob Peter Fuchs the care of the legacy of his friend Ferdinand Franz Wallraf bequeathed to the city of Cologne.
His own extensive art collection later became the foundation of the Cologne Kunstgewerbemuseums.

As a writer, he contributed to the renewal of the Cologne Carnival. In addition, he is one of three authors responsible for the art-historical part of the first Cologne city guide from 1828.

de Noël died in Cologne at the age of 66 and was buried in Cologne at the Melaten cemetery (lit. D).

Work 
Der Dom zu Köln. Historisch-archäologische Beschreibung. 2nd enlarged edition. DuMont-Schauberg, Cologne 1837 (Numerized)
Ausgewählte Gedichte. In Hermann Marggraff: Hausschatz der deutschen Humoristik. E. Wengler, Leipzig 1858,  (Numerized)

See also 
 , Scheibe aus der Sammlung de Noël im Museum Schnütgen (Cologne)
 , leadlight from the de Noël collection at the Museum Schnütgen

References

Further reading 
 Elga Böhm: Matthias Joseph de Noel (1782–1849). In Rheinische Lebensbilder, vol. 7. Rheinland Verlag, Cologne  1977, .
Skwirblies, Robert: De Noël, Matthias Joseph. In Savoy, Bénédicte und Nerlich, France (edit.): Pariser Lehrjahre. Ein Lexikon zur Ausbildung deutscher Maler in der französischen Hauptstadt. Vol. 1: 1793–1843, Berlin/Boston 2013, .
 Der erste Kölner Stadtführer aus dem Jahre 1828, edited and commented by Uwe Westfehling, Cologne, Bachem, 1982, 
 Carl Dietmar: Die Chronik Kölns, Chronik Verlag, Dortmund 1991,

External links 
 

German merchants
German art collectors
1782 births
1849 deaths
Businesspeople from Cologne
Writers from Cologne